Price Cobb (born December 10, 1954) is an American race car driver. He won the 1990 24 Hours of Le Mans together with John Nielsen and Martin Brundle in a Jaguar XJR-12. He also owned an Indy Racing League team in 1998 and 1999 for Roberto Guerrero and Jim Guthrie. He also has authored a number of books on auto racing.

Price is currently working in Austin, Texas with Moorespeed as general manager.

Racing record

SCCA National Championship Runoffs

24 Hours of Le Mans results

References

External links
Price Cobb's official website

1954 births
24 Hours of Le Mans drivers
24 Hours of Le Mans winning drivers
Atlantic Championship drivers
SCCA Formula Super Vee drivers
IndyCar Series team owners
Living people
Racing drivers from Texas
Sportspeople from Dallas
Trans-Am Series drivers
World Sportscar Championship drivers
SCCA National Championship Runoffs participants

Porsche Motorsports drivers
Jaguar Racing drivers